Cygnus NG-17, previously known as Cygnus OA-17, was the seventeenth flight of the Northrop Grumman robotic resupply spacecraft Cygnus and its sixteenth flight to the International Space Station (ISS) under the Commercial Resupply Services (CRS) contract with NASA. The mission launched on 19 February 2022. It was the sixth launch of Cygnus under the CRS-2 contract.

Orbital ATK’s space division (now part of Northrop Grumman Space Systems) and NASA jointly developed a new space transportation system to provide commercial cargo resupply services to the International Space Station (ISS). Under the Commercial Orbital Transportation Services (COTS) program, Orbital ATK designed, acquired, built, and assembled these components: Antares, a medium-class launch vehicle; Cygnus, an advanced spacecraft using a Pressurized Cargo Module (PCM) provided by industrial partner Thales Alenia Space and a Service Module based on the Orbital GEOStar satellite bus.

History 
Cygnus NG-17 was the sixth Cygnus mission under the Commercial Resupply Services-2 contract.

Production and integration of Cygnus spacecraft are performed in Dulles, Virginia. The Cygnus service module is mated with the pressurized cargo module at the launch site, and mission operations are conducted from control centers in Dulles, Virginia and Houston, Texas.

Spacecraft 

This was the twelfth flight of the Enhanced-sized Cygnus PCM. Northrop Grumman named this spacecraft after Piers Sellers, in celebration of his role in assembling the International Space Station.

Manifest 

 Crew supplies:          
 Science investigations: 
 Spacewalk equipment:    
 Vehicle hardware:       
 Computer resources:

ISS reboost
Aside from the orbital delivery, Cygnus performed the program's first operational reboost of the ISS. The space station's orbit needs to be changed from time to time as it naturally falls back in Earth's atmosphere. The ISS will change its attitude by about 90 degrees before executing the Cygnus reboost on 18 June 2022.

On 20 June 2022 at 15:20 UTC, Cygnus NG-17 gimbal engine was scheduled to fire for 5 minutes and 1 second but the firing was aborted after 5 seconds.

On Saturday, June 25, 2022 at 17:42 UTC, Northrop Grumman’s Cygnus completed its first limited reboost of the International Space Station. Cygnus’ gimbaled delta velocity engine was used to adjust the space station’s orbit through a reboost of the altitude of the space station. The maneuver lasted 5 minutes, 1 second and raised the station’s altitude 1/10 of a mile at apogee and 5/10 of a mile at perigee.

Research 
The new experiments that have arrived at the orbiting laboratory will inspire future scientists and explorers, and provide valuable insight for researchers.

NASA Glenn Research Center studies:
 TBD

See also 
 Uncrewed spaceflights to the International Space Station

References

External links 
 Northrop Grumman Commercial Resupply, NASA page

Cygnus (spacecraft)
Supply vehicles for the International Space Station
Spacecraft launched in 2022
Spacecraft launched by Antares rockets